Paul Langlois may refer to:

Paul Langlois (musician), Canadian musician
Paul Langlois (politician) (1926–2012), member of Canadian Parliament